"Late Night Talking" is a song by English singer Harry Styles. The song was released to US pop radio as the second single from his third studio album Harry's House on 21 June 2022. A music video for the song was later released on 13 July 2022, in which Styles is shown exploring the world on different beds.

Background and composition
On 1 April 2022, Styles released the lead single "As It Was" to critical acclaim and commercial success. The song was debuted during his Coachella performance. "Late Night Talking" was described as a "glossy R&B shifter" that fills "every available space with some or other moving part, right down to vocal parts mimicking brass".

Music video 
The video, directed by Bradley and Pablo and released on 13 July 2022, finds Styles following a portal in his own bed that leads him to an array of other beds — one in an art gallery, another in a restaurant, a theatre, and another that speeds through the streets of London past Buckingham Palace. The clip also comes complete with a pillow fight and Styles officiating a bed-ridden wedding, before falling through the sky on his bed.

Accolades

Live performance
He performed a live version of the song on the Today Show on May 19, and also included the song in a set he performed for BBC Radio 1, along with "As It Was", "Boyfriends" and a cover of "Wet Dream" by Wet Leg on 24 May 2022.

Charts

Weekly charts

Year-end charts

Certifications

Release history

Notes

References

2022 songs
2022 singles
British contemporary R&B songs
Columbia Records singles
Harry Styles songs
Songs written by Harry Styles
Songs written by Kid Harpoon
Song recordings produced by Kid Harpoon
Song recordings produced by Tyler Johnson (musician)